Jang Jae-Sim (born 3 January 1980) is a retired Korean judoka who competed in the 2000 Summer Olympics.

References

1980 births
Living people
Olympic judoka of South Korea
Judoka at the 2000 Summer Olympics
Place of birth missing (living people)
South Korean female judoka